Hit 3 Pack: Forever is the seventh EP by American rock band Papa Roach. The EP is only available digitally. It features three of the band's biggest hits.

Track listing

Personnel
 Jacoby Shaddix - lead vocals
 Jerry Horton - guitar, backing vocals
 Tobin Esperance - bass, backing vocals
 Dave Buckner - drums

References

Papa Roach EPs
2007 EPs
ITunes-exclusive releases
Albums produced by Howard Benson